Doug Baker or Douglas Baker may refer to:
Doug Baker (baseball) (born 1961), American former Major League Baseball player
Doug Baker (rugby union) (1929–2023), England national rugby union footballer
Douglas Baker (aviator) United States Navy pilot and World War II fighter ace
Douglas Baker (EastEnders), character on EastEnders (2007)
Douglas M. Baker Jr. (born 1958), American businessman
Ox Baker or Doug Baker (1934–2014), American professional wrestler
Doug Baker, columnist for the Portland Oregon Journal
Doug Baker, voice artist in DragonBlade: The Legend of Lang (2005)

See also
Baker (surname)